The Space Flight Award is an award given by the American Astronautical Society most years since 1955. It is presented to "the person whose outstanding efforts and achievements have contributed most significantly to the advancement of space flight and space exploration". The Society refers to the Space Flight Award as its "highest award".

See also
 List of space technology awards

References

Spaceflight
Awards of the American Astronautical Society